Italian Line and from 1992 Italia Line, whose official name was Italia di Navigazione S.p.A., was a passenger shipping line that operated regular transatlantic services between Italy and the United States, and Italy and South America. During the late 1960s the company turned to running cruises, and from 1981 it became a global freight operator.

History

The company was founded in 1932 through a merger of the Genoa-based Navigazione Generale Italiana (NGI), the Turin-based Lloyd Sabaudo, and the Trieste-based Cosulich STN lines, encouraged by the Italian government.

In World War II the company lost many ships, including Rex and Conte di Savoia. Others were captured by the United States and converted into troopships; four of them survived the war: Conte Biancamano, Conte Grande, Saturnia, and Vulcania.

Commercial service was resumed in 1947 under the company's new name Società di navigazione Italia. In 1956, Andrea Doria, the company's three-year-old flagship collided with the Swedish ship Stockholm near Nantucket and sank, with passenger deaths estimated at 46 or 55. This ship was based on the same design as Andrea Doria, but was larger, and featured technical innovations.

In the late 1950s aircraft passenger travel had yet to have a noticeable effect on ocean-going passenger numbers between the United States and the Mediterranean. Building the ships took longer than expected, and they were not delivered until 1965. Being late into service, they were unable to compete profitably on the North Atlantic route. Although planned for cruising as an alternative, the ships had several design flaws that made their use as cruise ships problematic.

Despite huge financial loss, the Italian Line operated the transatlantic route until 1976, after which the Leonardo da Vinci was withdrawn from service; the Michelangelo and Raffaello had been sold the previous year. The Cristopher Columbo was also withdrawn from service at this time. The Leonardo da Vinci became a cruise ship in 1977–78, after which it was withdrawn due to high fuel costs.

Because of the unprofitability of the cruise business, the Italian Line turned to freight shipping.

Previously owned by the Italian government, the company was privatized in 1998 when sold to d'Amico Società di Navigazione. In August 2002, it was acquired by CP Ships, and in 2005 the Italian Line name ceased to exist following CP's one-brand strategy. CP Ships itself was bought-out in late 2005 by TUI AG, and merged with Hapag-Lloyd in mid-2006.

International identifiers
SCAC Code: ITAU
BIC Code (Container prefixes): ITAU

Ships

Passenger ships

Container ships

 GRT = gross register tonnage
 GT = gross tonnage

References

Further reading
 Italia Line: Official website – page offline – please refer to History of CP Ships
 Bureau International des Containers (Container prefix codes, now linking Italia Line units to Hapag-Lloyd due to the merger)
 CP Ships: Press release – CP Ships Completes Acquisition of Italia Di Navigazione, 6 August 2002
 CP Ships: Press release – CP Ships Adopts a Single Brand, 28. April 2005

External links

  – fleet list
  – images of company brochures
  – trade routes and ships of the Italian Line in the 1950s, 60s and 70s

Transport companies established in 1932
Italian companies established in 1932
Defunct shipping companies
Defunct transport companies of Italy
Defunct cruise lines
Transatlantic shipping companies
Shipping companies of Italy
Italian brands
Transport companies disestablished in 2002
Italian companies disestablished in 2002